The Detective is a 1986 video game by Sam Manthorpe and published by Argus Press Software.

Gameplay 
In the role of a Scotland Yard detective, the player arrives at the McFungus estate in London, 1974. Angus McFungus is murdered and the player is challenged to collect evidence and reveal the murderer. The game functions on a strict time limit and the player loses the case if the murderer cannot be found in time.

Remake 
A freeware version of the game was released for the Nintendo DS on December 20, 2009. The game can be downloaded on the official website and cannot be purchased in stores.

References

External links

The Detective at Gamebase 64
The Detective Game official website for the Nintendo DS remake

1986 video games
Adventure games
Commodore 64 games
Nintendo DS games
Video games about police officers
Video games set in 1974
Video games set in London
Detective video games
Video games developed in the United Kingdom